William Benning Webb (September 17, 1825  March 13, 1896) was an American politician and attorney who was the Police Superintendent of Washington, D.C., and president of the board of commissioners for the District of Columbia, U.S., from 1886 to 1889. He was the first President of the Board of Commissioners to be born in Washington.

Biography
Webb was born in the City of Washington, DC on September 17, 1825. He was only 19 years old when he graduated from Columbia College (now George Washington University, and was admitted to the District of Columbia bar Three years later. Upon admission he entered practice, in which he remained until 1861. That year, the capital's Metropolitan Police Department was organized, and Webb was appointed its first superintendent by Mayor Richard Wallach. It was under Webb's administration that the police force conducted the investigation into the assassination of Abraham Lincoln in 1865. That same year, Webb resigned from the Police Department and returned to his Washington law practice, where he commanded an extremely high reputation among his colleagues. The Washington Post said of Webb that "his digest of municipal laws, as affecting the national capital, is regarded as the standard authority."

In 1885, upon the vacancy of Joseph Rodman West from his seat on the D.C. Board of Commissioners, President Grover Cleveland surprised the city establishment by offering the appointment to the popular and respected Webb, who accepted and joined the commission for its sixth session in July, 1885. When board president James Barker Edmonds declined reappointment on April 1, 1886, Cleveland raised Webb to the position.

Webb died at his home in Washington on March 13, 1896, at the age of 70. He was buried at Oak Hill Cemetery.

In 1901, The William Benning Webb School, named in his honor, opened at 15th and Rosedale, NE. It was an all-white school, but by 1947 it had become unused and at late that year became an annex to all-black Browne Junior High School. It was shut down some time shortly thereafter and has been used for school storage ever since.

References

1825 births
1896 deaths
19th-century American politicians
Burials at Oak Hill Cemetery (Washington, D.C.)
Mayors of Washington, D.C.
Members of the Board of Commissioners for the District of Columbia